Juan Rojas (died 21 May 1578) was a Roman Catholic prelate who served as Bishop of Agrigento (1577–1578).

Biography
On 9 October 1577, Juan Rojas was appointed by Pope Gregory XIII as Bishop of Agrigento. 
He served as Bishop of Agrigento until his death on 21 May 1578.

References

External links and additional sources
 (for Chronology of Bishops)
 (for Chronology of Bishops) 

1578 deaths
16th-century Roman Catholic bishops in Sicily
Bishops appointed by Pope Gregory XIII